Bastian Clevé (born 1 January 1950, in Munich), is a German filmmaker and producer. He is Professor and Head of the Film Production-Department at the Film Academy Baden-Wuerttemberg in Ludwigsburg, Germany.

Biography
Clevé grew up in Hamburg. After a two-year stint as sound-assistant at the TV-studios in Munich he studied Visual Communication in Hamburg at the Hochschule für bildende Künste Hamburg (University of Fine Arts of Hamburg) where he continued filmmaking. In 1975/76 he was awarded a one-year scholarship by the German Academic Exchange Service DAAD to study at the San Francisco Art Institute. He was touring with his experimental short films throughout the continent. After a brief return to Germany he relocated to Los Angeles in 1979 where he worked as a freelance writer, director and producer.

In 1991 he returned to Germany to become Professor and Head of the Department for “Film Production and the Business of Entertainment” at the newly established Film Academy Baden-Wuerttemberg, in charge of the training program and the curriculum for motion-picture- and TV-producers. Clevé wrote and edited more than two dozens books on filmmaking and film production. He is married with a daughter.

Work
Clevé started personal filmmaking in 1969 with short-films progressing into feature-lengths works. He sustained his efforts by winning awards and by touring and lecturing extensively throughout the world. Upon moving to Los Angeles he focused on the commercial side of filmmaking by picking up the craft of producing. He continued both his artistic and commercial filmmaking later on throughout his professorship in Germany.

His first DVD entitled Journeys contains Schau ins Land, Nachtwache, Lichtblick, Die Reise, Empor, Nach Bluff and Fatehpur Sikri.

Filmography
The focus of Clevé‘s artistic filmmaking lies in the manipulation of real-live imagery using sophisticated in-camera-editing and optical printing.

Short films
1971	Pariser Traum / Rève Parisien	
1974	Götterdämmerung		
1975	Schau ins Land
 Seelig
 Nachtwache			
Lichtblick									
1977	Über den Flammenbaum
Die Reise					
Empor										
Nach Bluff						
1978	Amerika: Neben anderem: Rodeo	
 Szenische Übersicht	
 Parade für die Unabhängigkeit	
 Am Wegerand			
1979	Tollhaus
1980	Raga							
 Oscar				
 Sehen ist Glauben				
 Labyrinth						
 Fatehpur Sikri	
 East I
 East II
 Transit
1981	Puzzles
 Zenith							
 Tollhaus II
1982	Der mystische Augenblick	
 Kaskaden
 Echo				
1983	Pool				
 Motion Picture	
 Descanso		
 Winterlandschaft		
1986	Kyrie

Feature-length films
1978	San Francisco Zephyr		
 Der Deutschlandfahrer		
1980	Exit Sunset Boulevard	
1981	Holi			
1983	Der Sheriff aus Altona	
1986	Das blinde Glück		
1988	Die Reise aus dem 23.Jahrhundert		
1992	Winterreise im Jahre 1	
2001	So weit die Füße tragen (a.k.a. As Far as My Feet Will Carry Me)	
2005	Klang der Ewigkeit (a.k.a. Sound of Eternity)

Commercial filmmaking
Clevé‘s commercial filmmaking as a writer/director/producer has been for TV and as producer/production-manager/line-producer for German and American third party projects (Bagdad Café''') or other contracted work. He has worked and produced throughout the world.Lumigraph	Oskar Fischinger – Life and WorkDie Familie Oppermann			Melodie einer Stadt: CaracasMelodie einer Stadt: BogotaMelodie einer Stadt: Saõ Paulo	Melodie einer Stadt: Vancouver Melodie einer Stadt: Quebec City	Die experimentellen Filme des Bastian ClevéMelodie einer Stadt: Buenos AiresMelodie einer Stadt: Rio de JaneiroMelodie einer Stadt: Mexiko	Out of Rosenheim (a.k.a. Bagdad Café)	
Nightchildren			
Die verklärte Nacht

Honors and awards (selection)
Lichtblick				BMI-Award 1976
Empor				German Film Award 1978
Am Wegerand			German Film Award 1979
San Francisco Zephyr	 	French Film-Critic’s Award, Hyères Filmfestival 78
Der Deutschlandfahrer		BMI-Shortfilm-Award   1978
Exit Sunset Boulevard		BMI-Screenplay-Award 1978
Das blinde Glück			BMI-Screenplay-Award 1985
Sound of Eternity			HD Fest DEFFY-Award 2006

Books (selection)
1989	The Art of Personal Filmmaking	
1994	Film Production Management		
 Interview: Philipp Glass			
1997	1.Akademiekreis Production Value
 Development/Stoffentwicklung
 Cashing In – Chancen und Risisken privater Filmfinanzierungsfonds
 Wege zum Geld	
 Drehen in Deutschland – Shooting in Germany
1998	Investoren im Visier
 Von der Idee zum Film
1999	Film Production  Management			
2005	Gib niemals auf – Filmökonomie in der Praxis

References

External links 

Study programs at Filmakademie
Soweit die Füsse tragen
Klang der Ewigkeit
DAAD Alumni
Interview

Film directors from Munich
Living people
1950 births
University of Fine Arts of Hamburg alumni